Lieder is the debut studio album by German singer Adel Tawil. It was released on November 7, 2013, by Vertigo Berlin.

Track listing

Notes
  denotes additional producer

Charts

Weekly charts

Year-end charts

Certifications and sales

References

External links
 Adel-Tawil.de — official site

2013 albums